Centurion Park is a cricket ground in Centurion, Gauteng, South Africa. It is also known as SuperSport Park since television company SuperSport bought shares in the stadium. The capacity of the ground is 22,000.

The Titans cricket team have played most of their home games here since 2004. The ground was home to the Titans' predecessor team Northerns (previously Northern Transvaal) since 1986. It is also the home ground of the Pretoria Capitals.

Name
The town of Verwoerdburg was renamed Centurion at the end of apartheid, with the politically neutral new name of the town coming from that of the cricket ground.

Notable fixtures

Test matches
The first Test match at Centurion was held in November 1995, as the opening match of the first post-apartheid tour of South Africa by the England cricket team; however, the match was drawn after being severely affected by rain.

Centurion was the venue for the notorious fifth Test match of the next England tour in 2000, when (after three days' play were lost to rain) South African captain Hansie Cronje forfeited his team's second innings to allow for a result on the final day of the match, which England won. It was later revealed that Cronje had done so after being approached by a bookmaker and offered money to stop the match ending in a draw.

Further controversy occurred in 2001, when the scheduled third Test between South Africa and India at Centurion was declared to be an "unofficial" Test after the Board of Control for Cricket in India refused to accept the International Cricket Council's match referee, Mike Denness, who had disciplined several Indian players in the previous match at Port Elizabeth.

In December 2010, India batsman Sachin Tendulkar scored his 50th Test century at Centurion in the first Test of the 2010–11 Indian tour of South Africa.

From the summer of 2018/19, the ground usually hosts a Boxing Day Test.

One-Day Internationals
Centurion was a venue for the 2003 Cricket World Cup which took place in South Africa. It was also selected as a venue for the 2009 ICC Champions Trophy and hosted the final on 5 October 2009.

Other cricket competitions
The 2009 Indian Premier League was held in South Africa, and Centurion was one of eight grounds used.  It hosted twelve matches, including one of the semi-finals.

Supersport Park also hosted a domestic and continental Sixes tournament, where home side, the Titans, came out on top in the domestic competition, and South Africa winning the continental competition against Kenya in the final.

Other sports
Centurion hosted an Australian rules football practice match in 2008 between Carlton and Fremantle.

Music
On 17 September 2011, Irish vocal pop band Westlife held a concert for Gravity Tour supporting their album Gravity.

Records

Cricket records

Test records
 Highest Test Total: 621 – South Africa vs. Sri Lanka, 26 December 2020
 Highest Individual Test Score: 208 – Hashim Amla, South Africa vs. West Indies, 17 December 2014
 Best Test Innings Bowling Figures: 7/29 – Kyle Abbott, South Africa vs. Pakistan, 22 February 2013
 Best Test Match Bowling Figures: 13/144 – Kagiso Rabada, South Africa vs. England, 22 January 2016

See also
List of Test cricket grounds

References

External links

Cricket grounds in South Africa
Australian rules football grounds
2003 Cricket World Cup stadiums
Sports venues in Pretoria
Test cricket grounds in South Africa